People Get Ready is a studio album by the Impressions, released on ABC-Paramount in 1965. It contains Curtis Mayfield's "People Get Ready", which was a successful single that had a significant impact on the civil rights movement. The album reached number 23 on the Billboard 200 chart and number 1 on the Top R&B/Hip-Hop Albums chart.

Track listing

Personnel
Credits adapted from liner notes.
 Curtis Mayfield – lead vocals, guitar
 Fred Cash – backing vocals
 Sam Gooden – backing vocals
 The Funk Brothers – instrumentation
 Johnny Pate – arrangement, production

Charts

See also
 List of Billboard number-one R&B albums of 1965

References

External links
 

1965 albums
The Impressions albums
Albums arranged by Johnny Pate
Albums produced by Johnny Pate
ABC Records albums
MCA Records albums